Igrok may refer to

The Gambler (novel) (by Dostoevsky)

or 

The Gambler (opera by Prokofiev).